The 1981 Nottinghamshire County Council election was held on Thursday, 7 May. Following boundary changes to the county's electoral divisions, the whole council of eighty-eight members was up for election. The Labour Party regained control from the Conservatives, winning fifty-five seats. The Conservatives won thirty-two councillors and one Residents' association councillor was elected in the Hucknall East division.

Results by division
Each electoral division returned one county councillor. The candidate elected to the council in each electoral division is shown in the table below.

References

1981
1981 English local elections
1980s in Nottinghamshire